Urbar may refer to:

Places in Rhineland-Palatinate, Germany:
Urbar, Mayen-Koblenz
Urbar, Rhein-Hunsrück

Nancy
 Urbarium (German: Urbar), a medieval register of fief ownership, including the rights and benefits that the fief holder has over his serfs and peasants